"Goober Peas" is a traditional folk song probably originating in the Southern United States. It was popular with Confederate soldiers during the American Civil War, and is still sung frequently in the South to this day.  It has been recorded and sung by scores of artists, including Burl Ives, Tennessee Ernie Ford, Rusty Draper and The Kingston Trio.

The lyrics of "Goober Peas" are a description of daily life during the latter part of the Civil War for Southerners. After being cut off from the rail lines and their farm land, they had little to eat aside from boiled peanuts (or "goober peas") which often served as an emergency ration. Peanuts were also known as pindars and goobers.

Publication date on the earliest sheet music is 1866, published by A. E. Blackmar in New Orleans. Blackmar humorously lists A. Pindar as the lyricist and P. Nutt as the composer.

Lyrics

Verse 1
Sitting by the roadside on a summer's day
Chatting with my mess-mates, passing time away
Lying in the shadows underneath the trees
Goodness, how delicious, eating goober peas.

Chorus
Peas, peas, peas, peas
Eating goober peas
Goodness, how delicious,
Eating goober peas.

Verse 2
When a horse-man passes, the soldiers have a rule
To cry out their loudest, "Mister, here's your mule!"
But another custom, enchanting-er than these
Is wearing out your grinders, eating goober peas.
Chorus

Verse 3
Just before the battle, the General hears a row
He says "The Yanks are coming, I hear their rifles now."
He turns around in wonder, and what d'ya think he sees?
The 15th Alabama, eating goober peas. 
Chorus
(Note: There sat the 15th Alabama, is reported in contemporary accounts)

Verse 4
I think my song has lasted almost long enough.
The subject's interesting, but the rhymes are mighty tough.
I wish the war was over, so free from rags and fleas
We'd kiss our wives and sweethearts, and gobble goober peas.
Chorus

Additional verse
The Reverend Wayland Fuller Dunaway recorded a stanza of the song he heard while imprisoned at the Union prison on Johnson's Island, Ohio, during the latter part of the Civil War. Dunaway had been a captain in Co. I, 40th Virginia Infantry, when captured during the Battle of Falling Waters in July 1863. His stanza:
But now we are in prison and likely long to stay,
The Yankees they are guarding us, no hope to get away;
Our rations they are scanty, 'tis cold enough to freeze,—
I wish I was in Georgia, eating goober peas.
Peas, peas, peas, peas,
Eating goober peas;
I wish I was in Georgia, eating goober peas.
—Stanza of a Prison Song.

In popular culture
 In Veep Season 3 Episode 3 "Alicia", Mike is made to kneel and sing "Goober Peas" by Jonah in order to not publish a compromising story.

References

Bibliography
Dunaway, Wayland Fuller. Reminiscences of a Rebel. New York: The Neale Publishing Company (1913).
Pindar, A., Esq. (w.); Nutt, P., Esq. (m.). "Goober Peas" (sheet music). New Orleans : A.E. Blackmar (1866).

External links
 Sheet music, in the Levy Sheet Music Collection

American folk songs
Songs of the American Civil War
Georgia (U.S. state) in the American Civil War
Burl Ives songs
Songs about the military
Year of song unknown